Edmund John Brandon (May 24, 1894 – November 1, 1946) was an American attorney and government official who served as the Administrator of the U.S. Securities and Exchange Commission's Boston Regional Office, Zone 1 in 1935.  He eventually resigned as commissioner because he had too much work to do as receiver of the Atlantic National Bank.

He also served as the United States Attorney for the District of Massachusetts from February 9, 1939 to 1946. In his first year he had a record of 417 wins and one loss.

Early life
He was born in Cambridge, Massachusetts and attended their public schools. He went on to attend Boston College where he played football, and was later graduated from Boston University in 1919.  He passed the bar exam in 1918.

Personal life
Brandon served as the Massachusetts State Deputy of the Knights of Columbus from 1924 to 1927.  He was a friend of James Roosevelt.

During World War I, he was a Lt. Commander in the Engineering Training Department of the First Naval District.  Pope Pius XII made him a knight of the Sovereign Military Order of Malta.

References

Works cited

Members of the U.S. Securities and Exchange Commission
Massachusetts Democrats
United States Attorneys for the District of Massachusetts
1894 births
1946 deaths
United States Navy
World War I